Los Angeles Historic-Cultural Monuments are sites which have been designated by the Los Angeles, California, Cultural Heritage Commission as worthy of preservation based on architectural, historic and cultural criteria.

History
The Historic-Cultural Monument process has its origin in the Historic Buildings Committee formed in 1958 by the Los Angeles chapter of the American Institute of Architects. As growth and development in Los Angeles threatened the city's historic landmarks, the committee sought to implement a formal preservation program in cooperation with local civic, cultural and business organizations and municipal leaders. On April 30, 1962, a historic preservation ordinance proposed by the AIA committee was passed.

The original Cultural Heritage Board (later renamed a commission) was formed in the summer of 1962, consisting of William Woollett, FAIA, Bonnie H. Riedel, Carl S. Dentzel, Senaida Sullivan and Edith Gibbs Vaughan.

The board met for the first time in August 1962, at a time when the owner of the historic Leonis Adobe was attempting to demolish the structure and replace it with a supermarket.  In its first day of official business, the board designated the Leonis Adobe and four other sites as Historic-Cultural Monuments.

In the commission's first decade of operation (August 1962–August 1972), it designated 101 properties as Historic-Cultural Monuments. By April 2018, there were over 1150 designated properties.

Process
The designation of a property as a Historic-Cultural Monument does not prevent demolition or alteration. However, the designation requires permits for demolition or substantial alteration to be presented to the commission. The commission has the power to delay the demolition of a designated property for up to one year.

Notable monuments

Designated LAHCM outside the City of Los Angeles

Lists of L.A. Historic-Cultural Monuments
 Historic-Cultural Monuments in Downtown Los Angeles
 Historic-Cultural Monuments on the East and Northeast Sides
 Historic-Cultural Monuments in the Harbor area
 Historic-Cultural Monuments in Hollywood
 Historic-Cultural Monuments in the San Fernando Valley
 Historic-Cultural Monuments in Silver Lake, Angelino Heights, and Echo Park
 Historic-Cultural Monuments in South Los Angeles
 Historic-Cultural Monuments on the Westside
 Historic-Cultural Monuments in the Wilshire and Westlake areas

See also
 City of Los Angeles' Historic Preservation Overlay Zones
 National Register of Historic Places listings in Los Angeles
 List of California Historical Landmarks

References

External links

 Los Angeles Office of Historic Resources: Designated L.A. Historic-Cultural Monuments (LAHCM) website — with 'ever-updated' LAHCM List via PDF link.
 official Los Angeles Office of Historic Resources website — Homepage
 Los Angeles Cultural Heritage Commission website
 Designated LAHCM Landmarks by Neighborhood — L.A. Department of City Planning website
 Big Orange Landmarks:  "Exploring the Landmarks of Los Angeles, One Monument at a Time" — online photos and in-depth history of Los Angeles Historic-Cultural Monuments — Website curator: Floyd B. Bariscale.
 Big Orange Landmarks: Floyd B. Bariscale's Flickr Photostream — Big Orange Flickr Gallery of L.A.H.C.Monuments.

.
Buildings and structures in Los Angeles
Heritage registers in California
Locally designated landmarks in the United States
California culture
Landmarks in California